Jacinto Alcos is a pre-Second World War Cebuano writer.

Novel
 Handurawan (Recollections), an escapist adventure novel.

References
 Visayan Literature page—defunct

Year of birth missing
Year of death missing
Visayan writers
Cebuano writers
Filipino writers
Cebuano people